Zeev Farbman (born September 9, 1979) is an Israeli entrepreneur and the CEO and Co-Founder of Lightricks.

Early life and education
Zeev Farbman was born in Zaporizhia on September 9, 1979. He grew up in Yukutia, Russia. He immigrated to Netanya, Israel when he was 13. He received his PhD from Hebrew University of Jerusalem in Computer Science and was under the guidance of Prof. Dani Leshinski and Prof. Raanan Fattal.
Most of his research was focused on computational photography and published at ACM Transactions on Graphics at SIGGRAPH conference. At Hebrew University, he wrote a paper on Diffusion maps for edge-aware image editing. His research on tone mapping of HDR images was implemented in MATLAB (tonemapfarbman). He quit his studies to co-found Lightricks along with Nir Pochter, Yaron Inger, Amit Goldstein and Itai Tsiddon.

Lightricks
The company began in two apartments, but has since  moved into the Hebrew University campus. They also have offices in London, Germany and New York. Farbman believes his role is to lead the team of developers, designers and researchers building apps that give users creative license to produce their own visual material.
Pictures of a sleeping Farbman went viral when they were turned into memes.

Personal
In his spare time, he practices Brazilian Jiu-Jitsu.

References

External links
Zeev Farbman at Google Scholar

Living people
1979 births
Israeli Jews
People from Jerusalem
Hebrew University of Jerusalem alumni
Israeli chief executives
Israeli company founders
Israeli businesspeople